Ron Dias may refer to:

 Ron Dias (1937–2013), American animator and painter
 Ron Dias (director) (born 1983), Canadian filmmaker, best known for Bite of a Mango